NGC 2535 is an unbarred spiral galaxy exhibiting a weak inner ring structure around the nucleus in the constellation Cancer that is interacting with NGC 2536. The interaction has warped the disk and spiral arms of NGC 2535, producing an elongated structure, visible at ultraviolet wavelengths, that contain many bright, recently formed blue star clusters in addition to enhanced star forming regions around the galaxy center. The two galaxies are listed together in the Atlas of Peculiar Galaxies as an example of a spiral galaxy with a high surface brightness companion.

See also

 NGC 2536

References

External links
 
 Spitzer Space Telescope page on NGC 2535

Unbarred spiral galaxies
Peculiar galaxies
Interacting galaxies
Cancer (constellation)
2535
04264
22957
082